PKD may stand for:

 Philip K. Dick (1928–1982), American science fiction writer
 ICAO PKD, the International Civil Aviation Organization Public Key Directory
 Paroxysmal kinesigenic dyskinesia, a movement disorder
 Pi Kappa Delta, a forensics honor society
 Polycystic kidney disease
 PKD1 and PKD2, human genes
 Proliferative kidney disease, caused by the parasite Tetracapsuloides
 Proto-Kra–Dai language